Arsen Śliwiński (born 3 April 1996) is a Polish sprint canoeist. He participated at the 2017 ICF Canoe Sprint World Championships and 2018 ICF Canoe Sprint World Championships.

References

External links

1996 births
Polish male canoeists
Living people
ICF Canoe Sprint World Championships medalists in Canadian